"The End of the World" is a song by English rock band the Cure. It was the first single to be released from their 12th studio album, The Cure (2004), and reached the top 40 in Italy and the United Kingdom.

Music video
The music video was directed by Floria Sigismondi and shows Smith in a house which begins to destroy itself. As he leaves the house, it becomes debris and the rest of the band find stuff from the debris. The video ends with the house rebuilding itself and Smith going back inside and plants growing on the floor.

Release
"The End of the World" was the band's most successful single since 1996's "Mint Car", peaking at number 19 in Italy, number 25 on the UK Singles Chart, number 19 on the Billboard Hot Modern Rock Tracks chart in the United States, and number 42 on the Irish Singles Chart. The song also charted in France, Germany, and Switzerland.

Track listing
"The End of the World (Radio Edit)" – 3:31
"This Morning" – 7:14
"Fake" – 4:41

Personnel
Robert Smith – vocals, guitar
Simon Gallup – bass guitar
Perry Bamonte – guitar
Roger O'Donnell – keyboards
Jason Cooper – drums

Charts

References

External links
 

2004 singles
The Cure songs
Music videos directed by Floria Sigismondi
Songs written by Robert Smith (musician)
Rock ballads
2004 songs
Geffen Records singles
Songs written by Simon Gallup
Songs written by Jason Cooper